Briton Rivière  (14 August 1840 in London20 April 1920 in London) was a British artist of Huguenot descent. He exhibited a variety of paintings at the Royal Academy, but devoted much of his life to animal paintings.

Biography
Briton's father, William Rivière (1806–1876), was for some years drawing-master at Cheltenham College, and then an art teacher at the University of Oxford. Briton was educated at Cheltenham College and Oxford, where he took his degree in 1867. For his art training he was indebted almost entirely to his father. His paternal uncle Henry Parsons Rivière (1811–1888) was also a noted watercolourist, exhibiting works at the Royal Watercolour Society, London and the Royal Birmingham Society of Artists.

His first pictures appeared at the British Institution, and in 1857 he exhibited three works at the Royal Academy, but it was not until 1863 that he became a regular contributor to the Academy exhibitions. In that year he was represented by The eve of the Spanish Armada, and in 1864 by a Romeo and Juliet. However, subjects of this kind did not attract him long, for in 1865 he began, with Sleeping Deerhound, a series of paintings of animal-subjects which occupied much of the rest of his life. In a lengthy interview in Chums Boys Annual, entitled "How I paint animals", Rivière explained some of the practicalities of painting both tame and wild animals:

Early in his career, Rivière made some mark as an illustrator, beginning with Punch. He was elected an Associate of the Royal Academy of Arts in 1878, and a Royal Academician in 1881, and received the degree of Doctor of Civil Law at Oxford in 1891. He was narrowly defeated in the election for President of the Royal Academy in 1896. His wife, Mary Alice Rivière (née Dobell; 1844–1931) whom he married in 1867, was a painter and exhibited briefly at the Royal Academy of Arts in 1869–70. After his death she presented the British Museum with four of his drawings (and an etching "The king drinks"), which complements the dozens of prints made after his work housed there, especially by Frederick Stacpoole and William Henry Simmons. The artist and his wife had seven children; five sons and two daughters. One of the sons, Hugh Goldwin Rivière (1869–1956), became a portraitist; another son (Evelyn) married the eminent psychoanalyst and translator of Sigmund Freud known as Joan Riviere.

Works

Paintings by Rivière are held by public institutions including the Tate, Metropolitan Museum of Art, Royal Holloway, University of London and Chrysler Museum of Art.

These include:
Argus (1873)
War Time (1874)
Sympathy (c.1878)
 'There's many a slip twixt the cup and the lip' (1881)

References

Sources

 Armstrong, Sir Walter (1891). Briton Rivière, R.A; His Life and Work, The Art Annual.

External links 

 
 
 Profile on Royal Academy of Arts Collections

1840 births
1920 deaths
19th-century English painters
English male painters
20th-century English painters
Animal artists
People educated at Cheltenham College
Royal Academicians
19th-century English male artists
20th-century English male artists